Chalitpong Jantakul  (born 4 March 1989 is a Thai professional footballer who plays as a defender for Lamphun Warrior.

International career
After defeating Palestine in the 1st preliminary round of the qualifiers for the 2012 London Olympics men's football tournament on penalties, the Thai national football team was disqualified for fielding an ineligible player, Jantakul, in the first leg. He had received a one-match suspension from the 2008 AFC U-19 Championship, and although he was listed as part of the team for the 2010 Asian Games men's football tournament (and sat out the first game as per the suspension), it was deemed that he had not served his suspension, as the Asian Games tournament was not sanctioned by the AFC.

International

Honours

Club
Sriracha 
 Thai Division 1 League (1): 2010

 Lamphun Warriors
 Thai League 2 (1): 2021–22

References

External links
 

1989 births
Living people
Chalitpong Jantakul
Chalitpong Jantakul
Association football defenders
Chalitpong Jantakul
Chalitpong Jantakul
Chalitpong Jantakul
Chalitpong Jantakul
Chalitpong Jantakul
Chalitpong Jantakul
Chalitpong Jantakul
Chalitpong Jantakul
Chalitpong Jantakul
Footballers at the 2010 Asian Games
Chalitpong Jantakul